Mechanicsburg is a borough in Cumberland County, Pennsylvania, United States. The borough is eight miles (13 km) west of Harrisburg. It is part of the Harrisburg–Carlisle metropolitan statistical area. As of the 2010 census it had a population of 8,981.

Geography
It is in a rich agricultural region known as the Cumberland Valley, a broad zone between South Mountain and the Ridge-and-Valley Appalachians.

Mechanicsburg is bordered by Silver Spring Township to the northwest, Monroe Township to the southwest, Upper Allen Township to the south, Lower Allen Township to the east, and Hampden Township to the northeast. Pennsylvania Route 641 (Trindle Road) is the main east–west street through the borough, leading east  to Camp Hill and west  to Carlisle, the county seat. Pennsylvania Route 114 leads north out of town on York Street and south on Market Street. Interstate 76, the Pennsylvania Turnpike, passes just south of Mechanicsburg, with access to the southeast of town via Exit 236 (U.S. Route 15).

The hardiness zone is borderline between 6b and 7a, meaning that the annual average absolute minimum temperature is approximately 0 °F.

Demographics
In 1900, 3,841 people lived here; in 1910, the population was 4,469, which increased to 5,709 in 1940. As of the 2010 census, the borough population was 8,981. 

As of the census of 2000, there were 9,042 people, 4,023 households, and 2,466 families residing in the borough. The racial makeup of the borough was 96.97% White, 0.43% African American, 0.09% Native American, 1.15% Asian, 0.28% from other races, and 1.08% from two or more races. Hispanic or Latino of any race were 0.83% of the population.

There were 4,024 households, out of which 25.7% had children under the age of 18 living with them, 49.1% were married couples living together, 8.8% had a female householder with no husband present, and 38.7% were non-families. Of all households, 32.8% were made up of individuals, and 10.3% had someone living alone who was 65 years of age or older. The average household size was 2.23 and the average family size was 2.85.

In the borough the population was spread out, with 21.5% under the age of 18, 7.3% from 18 to 24, 30.8% from 25 to 44, 24.6% from 45 to 64, and 15.8% who were 65 years of age or older. The median age was 39 years. For every 100 females, there were 91.3 males. For every 100 females age 18 and over, there were 86.7 males.

The median income for a household in the borough was $45,200, and the median income for a family was $54,228. Males had a median income of $37,130 versus $27,940 for females. The per capita income for the borough was $22,812. About 2.4% of families and 4.2% of the population were below the poverty line, including 6.0% of those under age 18 and 5.0% of those age 65 or over.

History 

Mechanicsburg was named after a settlement of mechanics who made and repaired Conestoga wagons in the early 19th century.

In 1837, when the Cumberland Valley Railroad (CVRR) completed its line, Mechanicsburg was designated as a water station, where workers could restock the locomotive with firewood and water. This important function also contributed to the town's growth. The train became the town's link to the world of business and industry. Grain and feed companies, lumber yards and numerous factories were purposely built alongside the railroad tracks. Archives show that, at one time, there were twenty-five trains chugging through the town daily carrying travelers, coal, feathers, fruit, ice, mail and newspapers. During the American Civil War, the railroad was an invaluable method of transporting troops and supplies. Today, approximately six trains travel through Mechanicsburg each day, which has recently increased due to new operations on the local sub-line owned by Norfolk Southern. Although automotive technology changed the town forever, today's residents cannot dismiss the vital role the railroad played in its development.

NSA Mechanicsburg continues to serve as one of the Defense Department's major logistics sites.

Before becoming incorporated on April 12, 1828, the town went by several different names. First, Drytown, because of the extreme scarcity of water during the winter and summer. It was also known as Pinchgut, a German name used as a sign of amusement given to a small village of only a few people. Some also referred to the town as Staufferstown, in honor of Henry Stauffer, the owner of much of the land in the center of town, or briefly as Creekville during the Colonial Era.

On June 28, 1863, Confederate troops led by Brig. Gen. Albert G. Jenkins raided Mechanicsburg, and two days later, met with Union forces in the Skirmish of Sporting Hill, just east of town. Following the Skirmish of Sporting Hill, the Confederate forces retreated south into the little town of Gettysburg where the Battle of Gettysburg would be fought.

The oldest building in Mechanicsburg is the Frankeberger Tavern. One of Mechanicsburg's first residents was George Frankeberger, who in 1801 applied for a license to open his newly built log home for the "convenience" of travelers. In exchange for a small fee, Mr. Frankeberger offered cattle drivers a warm meal and a place to sleep. This proved to be rather lucrative, as many people were making the two-day trek between Harrisburg (the state capital) and Carlisle (Cumberland County's county seat).

Mechanicsburg is home to many historic markers, such as Irving Female College (named for Washington Irving, a trustee), the first women's college in Pennsylvania to grant degrees in arts and sciences.
The Mechanicsburg Commercial Historic District, Irving Female College, Cumberland Valley Railroad Station and Station Master's House, Adam Orris House, and Simpson Street School are listed on the National Register of Historic Places.

Government and infrastructure
The Pennsylvania Department of Corrections has its headquarters in Hampden Township, Cumberland County, near Mechanicsburg. Mechanicsburg lies in the center of a regional transportation crossroads, with Interstate 81, Interstate 76, Interstate 83, US Route 11, and US Route 15 passing in close proximity to the borough. The Appalachian Trail passes through Pennsylvania a few miles west of Mechanicsburg, in nearby Boiling Springs. The Naval Support Activity Mechanicsburg is located off the Carlisle Pike just outside of Mechanicsburg.

Points of interest
 Liberty Forge Arboretum
 Mechanicsburg Area Senior High School
 Cumberland Valley High School
 Messiah University
 Williams Grove Speedway
 Union Church
 Stationmaster's House
 Frankeberger Tavern
 Hall's tower

Notable people
 Seth "Scump" Abner: professional eSports competitor, two-time COD World Series Champion, and player for OpTic Texas.
 Shawn Abner: former Major League Baseball outfielder, father of Seth "Scump" Abner
Lionel Bender, linguist
 Abner Carroll Binder: newspaper correspondent and editor for the Chicago Daily News and the Minneapolis Tribune
 Bobby Dall: Bassist for the group Poison
 Charles Forsman: comic book author, writer of the graphic novel TEotFW which was adapted to a TV series for Netflix.
Shane Gillis: Comedian and podcaster.
 Luke Matheny: Academy Award-winning director, actor, and writer
 Bret Michaels: lead singer for the group Poison
 Jon Ritchie: former professional football player, currently a Philadelphia sports radio personality on WIP middays
 Rikki Rockett: Drummer for the group Poison
Carla Thomas: former professional basketball player (2007, 1st Rd Draft Pick), first Mid-Penn Women's Basketball player to be drafted into the WNBA
 Andrew Kevin Walker: screenwriter noted for writing Seven and other films
 Bobby Warshaw: retired professional soccer player, author of the book When the Dream Becomes Reality

See also

References

External links

 
 Borough of Mechanicsburg official website

Boroughs in Cumberland County, Pennsylvania
1828 establishments in Pennsylvania
Harrisburg–Carlisle metropolitan statistical area
Pennsylvania in the American Civil War
Populated places established in 1806